Madhupur Junction, station code MDP, is the railway station serving the city of Madhupur in the Deoghar district in the Indian state of Jharkhand. It connects the town and nearby areas to various metropolitan cities of the country. Howrah–Delhi main line via Mughalsarai–Patna route and Madhupur–Giridih–Koderma line are the two routes on this station. The Madhupur–Giridih–Koderma route is a single broad-gauge line. It has four platforms and handles many trains daily.

Further extension
A delay of more than 30 minutes for an engine change at Madhupur will thus be avoided. The estimated cost of the linking project is Rs 281 crore.

Facilities 
The major facilities available are waiting rooms, computerized reservation facility, reservation counter, and two-wheeler and four-wheeler vehicle parking. The vehicles are allowed to enter the station premises. The station also has a STD/ISD/PCO telephone booth, ATM counter, toilets, refreshment room, tea stall and book stall.

Platforms
There are four platforms. There are two foot overbridges connecting the two platforms. The bridges have stairs as well as a slope for trolleys.

Station layout

Trains 

Majority of the trains stops at Madhupur Junction which runs on Asansol–Patna leg of the Howrah–Delhi main line including premium trains such as Rajdhani Express.

Following are the trains to/from Madhupur running on the Madhupur–Giridih–Koderma line:

Nearest airports
The nearest airports to Madhupur Junction are:

 Deoghar Airport, Jharkhand   
 Birsa Munda Airport, Ranchi   
Netaji Subhash Chandra Bose International Airport, Kolkata    288 kilometres (179 mi)
Kazi Nazrul Islam Airport, Durgapur   126 kilometres (78 mi)
 Gaya Airport, Bihar  
 Lok Nayak Jayaprakash Airport, Patna,

See also 

 Giridih

References

External links 

 Madhupur Junction map

Railway stations in Deoghar district
Railway junction stations in Jharkhand
Asansol railway division